Mariia Bogacheva (born 26 April 1977) is a Russian Paralympic athlete competing in F54-classification javelin throw and shot put events. She is a gold medalist and a two-time silver medalist in the women's shot put F54 event at the World Para Athletics Championships. She also won six medals, including five golds, at the World Para Athletics European Championships.

She won the silver medal in the women's shot put F54 event at the 2019 World Para Athletics Championships held in Dubai, United Arab Emirates.

She competed at the 2020 Summer Paralympics in Tokyo, Japan.

References

External links 
 

Living people
1977 births
Place of birth missing (living people)
Russian female javelin throwers
Russian female shot putters
Medalists at the World Para Athletics European Championships
Medalists at the World Para Athletics Championships
Athletes (track and field) at the 2020 Summer Paralympics
21st-century Russian women